I.P. Suhr was a  cargo ship that was built in 1926 by Ostseewerft AG, Stettin as Siegmund for German owners. After a sale in 1929 she was renamed Thielbek. A further sale in 1939 saw her renamed Ingrid Traber. She was seized by the Allies in May 1945, passed to the Ministry of War Transport (MoWT) and renamed Empire Condover. In 1946, she was passed to the Norwegian Government and renamed Fornes. She was sold into merchant service in 1948 and renamed I.P. Suhr, serving until December 1950 when she capsized and sank.

Description
The ship was launched on 18 Dezember 1926 at Ostseewerft AG, Stettin, completed in March 1927 and put into service on 21 March 1927.

She had a GRT of 1,883. and a NRT of 1,084.

The engine was built by Ostsee Werft.

History
Siegmund was built for Emil R. Retzlaff, Stettin. She was sold in 1929 to Knohr & Burchard, Hamburg and renamed Thielbek. The Code Letters JBNG were allocated. On 9 December 1934, Thielbek ran aground at Befanaes, Denmark. She was later refloated and arrived at Kiel, Schleswig-Holstein, Germany on 16 December.

In 1934, her Code Letters were changed to DHXP. In 1939, she was sold to Traber & Co, Hamburg and renamed Ingrid Traber. This change was not recorded by Lloyds Register, she continued to be listed as Thielbek. Ingrid Traber was a member of a convoy which departed Hamburg on 6 March 1942 bound for Norway. On 1 May 1945, Ingrid Traber was in collision with the Hamburg-Südamerikanische Dampfschiffahrts-Gesellschaft steamship .

In May 1945, Ingrid Traber was seized by the Allies. She was passed to the MoWT and renamed Empire Condover. Her port of registry was changed to London. The United Kingdom Official Number 180720 and Code Letters GMWZ were allocated. She was placed under the management of E R Newbigin Ltd.  In 1946, she was allocated to the Norwegian Government and renamed Fornes. In 1948, she was sold to Aktieselskabet Det Danske Kulkompagni and renamed I.P. Suhr. Her port of registry was Kobenhavn and the Code Letters OYFJ were allocated. She was placed under the management of A Møller and N Westergaard. The wreck was blown up in 1952 and salvaged as scrap.

References

1926 ships
Ships built in Stettin
Steamships of Germany
Merchant ships of Germany
Maritime incidents in 1934
World War II merchant ships of Germany
Ministry of War Transport ships
Empire ships
Steamships of the United Kingdom
Merchant ships of the United Kingdom
Steamships of Norway
Merchant ships of Norway
Steamships of Denmark
Merchant ships of Denmark
Maritime incidents in 1950
Shipwrecks in the Baltic Sea